May We Borrow Your Husband? is a British television movie produced in 1986. The film was written by Dirk Bogarde and directed by Bob Mahoney. It starred Dirk Bogarde and Charlotte Attenborough.

Plot 
"May We Borrow Your Husband?" is the title story of a collection of what Graham Greene termed "comedies of the sexual life." The story is indeed something of a comedy of manners because the lifestyles of a particular class of English society come under the scrutiny of the author. The narrator, as both a novelist and an authority on Rochester, who was noted not only as a poet but also for his scandalous sex life, is an appropriate observer of the events that transpire before his eyes. On one occasion he remarks "You will notice that I play a very unheroic part in this comedy," although he does, in fact, endeavor to prevent what he sees as a potential tragedy and in the course of events falls in love as well.

Cast 
The film starred Dirk Bogarde as William Travis

Charlotte Attenborough as Poopy Travis

Claude Coppola as Barman

Patricia Davidson as English Woman

Jacques Diez as Maitre d'Hotel

Eric Galliano as Himself

Randal Herley as Mr. Ratcliffe

Patrick Le Barz as Himself

Francis Matthews as Stephen

Simon Shepherd as Peter Travis

David Yelland as Tony

External links 
 

1986 television films
1986 films
British drama television films